The Ultimate Bee Gees is a compilation album released to coincide with the 50th anniversary of the Bee Gees. Although the group did not start recording until 1963 on Festival Records in Australia, they began calling themselves the "Bee Gees" in 1959 after several name changes such as "Wee Johnny Hayes and the Bluecats", "The Rattlesnakes" and "BG's". Each disc is themed with the first containing more upbeat songs, called A Night Out, and the second containing slower songs and ballads, called A Night In, though the cover art does not distinguish this theme. Liner notes were written by Sir Tim Rice. This also marks the return of the 1970s era logo on an official Bee Gees release, which was last used on the Bee Gees' 1983 single "Someone Belonging to Someone".

Track listing
Though every song in the Bee Gees catalogue since 1967 has been mixed in stereo, a few early tracks are presented here in the mono mixes heard on the original single releases, for the first time on a CD compilation (the mono mixes were previously released on CD on the 2006 box set Studio Albums 1967–1968).

All songs were written by Barry Gibb, Robin Gibb and Maurice Gibb, except where noted.

Disc one

Disc two

 Bonus track on Japanese releases Rhino Records WPCR-13706-7 and WPZR-30352-4

DVD bonus disc
The Ultimate Bee Gees [Deluxe Edition] came with a bonus DVD containing promotional clips and videos. Though the promo clip for "Tomorrow, Tomorrow" is included on the DVD, the song is not included in the collection. All tracks are original studio recordings unless otherwise noted.
"Spicks and Specks" – Promo clip aired on Bandstand (Australia) – 19 November 1966
"New York Mining Disaster 1941"  Promo clip – 1967 (Mono album version)
"Massachusetts" – Performed live on Top of the Pops UK TV – 26 December 1967
"I've Gotta Get a Message to You" – from Idea TV Special – 1968 (Mono single mix)
"Tomorrow, Tomorrow" – Promo clip – 1969
"Lonely Days" – Promo clip – 1970 (Alternate studio version)
"How Can You Mend a Broken Heart" – Performed live on Whitaker's World of Music – 6/5/1971
"Run to Me" – Performed live on In Session US TV  – 1973
"Jive Talkin'" – Promo clip – 1975
"Night Fever" – Promo clip – 1977
"Stayin' Alive" – Promo clip – 1977 (Slightly sped up studio version)
"How Deep Is Your Love" – Promo clip – 1977 (Slightly sped up studio version)
"Too Much Heaven" – Promo clip – 1979
"For Whom the Bell Tolls" – Promo clip – 1993
"Alone" – Promo clip – 1997
"Still Waters (Run Deep)" – Promo clip – 1997
"You Win Again" – Promo clip – 1987
"One" – Promo clip – 1989 (Version 1)

Charts
Though there are not any new songs included in this compilation and there has been little promotion for it, the set has charted in the UK at No. 19 in its first week and in the US at No. 116 on the Billboard 200 top albums chart.

In May 2012, The Ultimate Bee Gees re-entered the Billboard 200 at No. 49 due to a huge increase in Bee Gees' album sales following the death of Robin Gibb.

Weekly charts

Year-end charts

References

Bee Gees compilation albums
2009 compilation albums
Reprise Records compilation albums
Albums recorded at IBC Studios